Francis Henry Wilson (born 1876, date of death unknown) was a British rugby union player who competed in the 1900 Summer Olympics. He was a member of the British rugby union team, which won the silver medal.

References

External links
 
 
 
 Francis wilson mentioned in  rugby history site

1876 births
Year of death missing
British rugby union players
Rugby union players at the 1900 Summer Olympics
Olympic rugby union players of Great Britain
Olympic silver medallists for Great Britain
Medalists at the 1900 Summer Olympics
Date of birth missing
Place of birth missing
Place of death missing